Anna Helene Ottosson (born 18 May 1976 in Östersund, Sweden; married name Ottosson Blixth) is a Swedish former alpine skier who won an Olympic bronze medal in the giant slalom race at the 2006 Winter Olympics in Turin. She stands 1.66 meters (5 ft 5 in) tall and weighs 64 kg (141 lbs).

Her only victory in a World Cup competition came when she won a giant slalom competition in Cortina d'Ampezzo, Italy on 23 January 2000.

World Cup competition victories

References

1976 births
Swedish female alpine skiers
Alpine skiers at the 1998 Winter Olympics
Alpine skiers at the 2002 Winter Olympics
Alpine skiers at the 2006 Winter Olympics
Olympic alpine skiers of Sweden
Medalists at the 2006 Winter Olympics
Olympic medalists in alpine skiing
Olympic bronze medalists for Sweden
Mid Sweden University alumni
People from Östersund
Living people
Sportspeople from Jämtland County